Showa crater is a feature on Sakurajima mountain volcano, in southern Japan.
The eruption occurred at 16:31 and was the 500th eruption of the year. Showa crater is monitored with infrared video and regular video cameras.

Showa crater is located on the eastern flank of Minami-dake (Southern Peak) of Sakurajima volcano.

Showa crater appeared in 1939 after one month of eruptions that year, at an elevation of 800 feet.

It continued to have intermittent eruptions for the next, almost a decade. There was a large lava flow out of Showa crater in 1946, which destroyed the village of Kurokami. In July 1948 Showa stopped erupting and remained quiet for 58 years. The dormancy ended in 2006, when eruptions out the crater resumed.

Examples of events at Showa crater (see also Sakurajima volcano)
1939-1948 misc. eruptions
2006 eruption 
2013 eruption  
In July 2016 a 5 km high column of ash erupted out of Showa crater.

References

External links
 Big Blast at Sakurajima Volcano, Japan (August 2013)
Ash column coming out of Showa crater

Landforms of Kagoshima Prefecture
Volcanoes of Kyushu
Volcanic craters